Siddick is a village in Cumbria, England, historically part of Cumberland. It lies within Workington civil parish.

As a coastal settlement on the Solway Firth (which is an inlet of the Irish Sea), fishing contributes to the local economy.

There is a large manufacturing area to the east of the village, with Swedish paper maker Iggesund Paperboard operating a large facility there. Eastman Chemical Company and Indorama Corporation used to own chemical plants in Siddick, but these have subsequently closed. To the south of the village is Dunmail Park shopping centre, where there is a multiplex cinema, a supermarket, and a number of other shops.

Governance
Siddick is part of the Workington constituency of the UK parliament. The current Member of Parliament as of 2019 is Mark Jenkinson, a Conservative, who unseated former MP Sue Hayman at the 2019 General Election. The Labour Party had previously won the seat in every general election since 1979; the Conservative Party had only won the 1976 Workington by-election since the Second World War.

For the European Parliament residents in Siddick voted to elect MEP's for the North West England constituency.

For Local Government purposes it is in the Seaton + Northside Ward of Allerdale Borough Council and the Seaton Division of Cumbria County Council.

Siddick  has its own Parish Council; Workington Town Council.

Siddick Ponds Nature Reserve
Siddick Ponds Nature Reserve is a protected area and Site of Special Scientific Interest to the south of the village. Ten thousand years ago the ponds were part of a delta in what is now the River Derwent. The name "Siddick" is believed to have come from "Siggit" or "Seagate", a racecourse formerly located close by. Coal was extracted from the St Helens pit nearby and affected the area; after the pit closed the land was reclaimed and replanted to create new wildlife habitats.

References

Villages in Cumbria
Allerdale